Amazon Echo Show is a smart speaker that is part of the Amazon Echo line of products. Similarly to other devices in the family, it is designed around Amazon's virtual assistant Alexa, but additionally features a touchscreen display that can be used to display visual information to accompany its responses, as well as play video and conduct video calls with other Echo Show users. The video call feature was later expanded to include all Skype users.

The Echo Show was unveiled on May 9, 2017 and released in the United States on June 28, 2017. It has received positive reviews, with critics noting its improved sound quality over the standard Echo speaker, its simplicity, and how the screen is used to supplement Alexa rather than act as a full-featured tablet. Critics have also noted that many third-party Alexa functions have not been updated to fully utilize the screen.

History 
The Echo Show was unveiled on May 9, 2017, and released in the United States on June 28, 2017. 

A second generation of the Echo Show was unveiled at an Alexa-themed product event by Amazon on September 20, 2018 for release the following month. This device has a 10-inch touchscreen, improved speakers, and mesh casing.

An Echo Show with a smaller, 5.5-inch screen was announced in May 2019 and launched in 12 countries in June 2019.

Hardware

First generation 
The first-generation Echo Show (released in June 2017) contains a pair of two-inch speakers and is distinguished from other Echo products by containing a 7-inch touchscreen. As with other Echo devices, it can conduct voice calls, as well as video calls to other Echo Show users and through Skype with its 5-megapixel front-facing camera.

Second generation 
The second-generation Echo Show (released in October 2018) is completely redesigned from the first generation. The new device replaces the black plastic with a mesh casing while keeping the same device shape. The speakers were moved to the side and back of the device to allow a 3-inch larger display. Amazon claims that the new version will have better sound quality. It also integrates a Zigbee hub, similar to the Echo Plus.

Echo Show 5 

The Echo Show 5 is a variation with a 5.5" display.

Echo Show 8 
The Echo Show 8 is a variation with an 8" display, announced in September 2019 for shipment in November 2019.

Third generation 
Highly innovative.

Echo Show 10 
The Echo Show 10 was the biggest Echo Show available until the Echo Show 15 was released.

Echo Show 15 
The Echo Show 15 is a 15.6", 1080p Full HD device designed to be wall-mounted (a departure from previous tabletop forms), but has a tilt stand (sold separately or in a bundle) that can stand on a table. Announced on September 28th, 2021 in Amazon's *Devices and Services Event* it also includes a 5MP camera, and received an update that allows it to run as a Fire TV natively.

Comparison

Features 
The screen on Echo Show can be used to display visual output for Alexa assistant responses. The devices contain motion sensors to automatically wake its screen when someone enters a room; in this state, it can also display prompts regarding news headlines, suggested Alexa commands, and other information. Alexa can also be used to request the playback of videos on its screen, such as Amazon Video content.

The "Drop In" feature allows users to, between designated contacts, automatically begin a call unannounced.

The Echo Show initially supported YouTube videos; on September 26, 2017, it was revealed that Google (who manufactures Google Home, a direct competitor to the Amazon Echo line) had blocked the device's access to the service, citing violations of its terms of service and ongoing negotiations. While Amazon later worked around the restriction by using the web version, Google announced that it would block YouTube from the Echo Show, as well as the Fire TV platform, citing Amazon's ongoing restrictions against the sale of products which compete with its own video ecosystem, and refusal to support its own video platform on Google devices. At the launch of the second-generation Echo Show, Amazon claimed that the issue was now fixed. YouTube searches are now performed using the Silk or Firefox web browsers on the device.

Security 

In November 2019, a security research team in the Pwn2Own hacking contest hacked into an Amazon Echo Show 5. They did so by hacking into the "patch gap" that meshed older software patched onto other platforms, as the smart screen used an old version of Chromium. The security team exploited the code using "an integer overflow JavaScript bug to hijack the device while it was connected to a malicious WiFi network." The bug allowed them to take "full control" of the device. The team shared the findings with Amazon, which said it was investigating the hack, and would take "appropriate steps."

Reception
The Verge compared the Echo Show to previous "internet appliances" such as the 3Com Audrey and Chumby, but acknowledged that neither of them was equipped with a voice-activated virtual assistant, and both were built with too much functionality. In comparison, Amazon was praised for having intentionally limited the amount of touchscreen-oriented functionality on the Echo Show, so that the device would not be complex. It was noted that few third-party Alexa Skills actually took advantage of the screen, and there were limited options for video services that integrated with Alexa. The sound quality of the Echo Show was perceived as being superior to the standard Echo, but lower than other dedicated speakers at the same price point. The camera was also panned for being angled upwards (thus making it harder for shorter people to use), and for not handling backlighting well. In conclusion, it was felt that "from nearly any other company, adding a screen would have resulted in feature-itis of the worst kind. By holding back, the Echo Show feels like it does more. Its strength is in its simplicity."

Pocket-lint felt that the white model had an "air of modern", but the black model looked "kind of dated, oddly boxy, and just downright blah to us". The updated mesh fabric covering on the second-generation product addressed these complaints. Its sound quality was praised for being able to "fill your entire room and then some", and the ability to look up and view YouTube videos was "not the fastest experience", but "quick enough and has yet to glitch out on us." The "Drop In" feature was praised as being potentially useful for checking on "elderly loved ones". The device was also praised for integrating with smart home products (such as home security cameras, which can display their feeds on the screen). However, it was felt that the "unfinished" Alexa still hampered the experience (noting an error where it played the film Creed when asked to play music by the band Creed), and that some Skills had not been updated to fully support the screen, but that "if nothing else, it is fun to poke around and explore what else Alexa can do." In conclusion, it was argued that at its price point, it could have featured higher-quality speakers and a full OS with an app store, but the sound quality alone justified its higher price over the original Echo.

In a review of the second-generation model, Pocket-lint praised its improvements to audio quality (albeit being "bass-heavy"), screen size, Zigbee support, and "neater" design. The display was panned for being too reflective and having a near-720p resolution. In addition, it was noted that optimization of third-party Skills for the Echo Show was still inconsistent.

See also
Google Assistant smart displays
Home automation

References

External links 
Amazon.com product listing

Echo Show
Products introduced in 2017
Smart speakers